is a Japanese actor.

Biography
While longing to Aoi Miyazaki, Sohma sent a resume to the talent agency Hirata Office and debuted in 2007.

In 2009, he appeared in Samurai Sentai Shinkenger as Genta Umemori / Shinken Gold to raise his recognition.

In 2014, his first main role in a film was Taiyō kara Plancha.

In 2017, he left Hirata Office.

In 2021, he would join another tokusatsu series Kamen Rider Saber as the series villain Master Logos (Isaac) / Kamen Rider Solomon, as well as a posthumous supporting ally Original Master Logos.

Filmography

TV series

Films

Direct-to-video films

Music videos

References

Japanese male actors
1986 births
Living people
People from Kanagawa Prefecture